The 2020 NRL Nines was the fifth edition of the NRL Nines rugby league nines and the first one hosted outside of Auckland. It was played at HBF Park, Perth on 14–15 February 2020. Just like previous tournaments, it was contested by all 16 National Rugby League teams, but for the first time, the four NRL Women's Premiership teams played as well, as opposed to the Jillaroos and Kiwi Ferns like in former editions. The men's tournament was split into four pools of four teams (1, 2, 3 & 4) and then into two groups of two teams in each pool (A & B). Each side was initially to play two games, against the teams from the other group of their pool. The top two teams in each pool then played off in a knockout-style tournament. The women's tournament, meanwhile, was a round-robin with each team playing three games, one against each of the others, before the top two teams met in the final. The tournament was drawn on 6 December 2019.

The Cowboys took out the men's title, beating the Dragons 23–14 in the final. Meanwhile, the Dragons won the women's title, with a 28–4 victory over the Broncos.

Men's tournament

Pool 1

Pool 2

Pool 3

Pool 4

Finals

Quarter-finals

Semi-finals

Grand Final

Women's tournament

Pool Stage

Grand Final

Team of the Tournament

Men

Women

References

2020 in rugby league
2020 NRL season
NRL
2020 in Australian rugby league